Disability in Mexico affects a substantial minority of the country's population, though estimates of the prevalence vary significantly. According to the 2000 Mexican census, there were 1,795,000 people with disabilities in the country, or 1.8% of the population. However, a 2005 brief by the Mexican government for a World Health Organization summit argued the methodology used for the census was flawed and led to under-reporting. A 2017 research paper cites a higher estimate of 6.0%, noting the prevalence was greater at 7.1% among Mexicans of indigenous background.

According to the Institute for Health Metrics and Evaluation, the top ten causes of disability in Mexico (by years lived with disability or YLDs) in 2017 were (beginning with the highest): diabetes, headache disorders, lower back pain, neonatal disorders, depressive disorders, blindness and visual impairment, age-related hearing loss, oral disorders, anxiety disorders, and other musculoskeletal disorders.

People with disabilities are less likely to be employed. Only 39.1% of people with disabilities in Mexico over the age of 15 are employed, compared to 64.1% of Mexicans overall.

Mexico is a party to the United Nations Convention on the Rights of Persons with Disabilities, having signed the treaty on 30 March 2007 and ratified it on 17 December 2007.

See also
 Mexico at the Paralympics
 Disability and poverty

References